Alexsandra Wright (born February 17, 1971) is a Canadian actress. She was previously in a relationship with Mathew Knowles and has one child with him.

Biography and personal life
Wright was born on February 17, 1971, in Montreal, Quebec.

In the late 2000s, Wright and Mathew Knowles began an 18-month affair during which Wright became pregnant. Paternity tests confirmed that Mathew Knowles is the father of her son, Nixon Knowles. On November 11, 2009, Tina Knowles filed for divorce from her husband, citing Matthew's affair with Wright. Wright publicly apologized to Tina, Beyoncé and Solange for the "pain [she] has contributed" to their lives. After the breakup with Knowles, Wright became engaged to Celebrity Fit Club trainer Harvey Walden IV.

Wright and her son currently live outside of Los Angeles, California. After the child support payments for Nixon were reduced in 2014, Wright and her son moved into temporary housing through a homeless support group.

Career
Wright's acting career began with an uncredited role in the 1989 television movie Third Degree Burn. A decade later, Wright appeared in the television show JAG in the episode "Psychic Warrior" and the 2000 drama Love Beat The Hell Outta Me. In 2001, Wright appeared in Baby Boy, a drama starring Tyrese Gibson, Taraji P. Henson, Snoop Doggy Dog and Omar Gooding.

Wright followed her appearance in Baby Boy with two television shows: the "My Fifteen Minutes" episode of Scrubs in 2001, and "The Young and the Meatless" episode of Girls Club in 2002.

Filmography

External links

References

1971 births
Actresses from Montreal
Beyoncé
Black Canadian actresses
Canadian expatriates in the United States
Canadian film actresses
Canadian television actresses
Living people